Events in the year 1969 in Spain.

Incumbents
Caudillo: Francisco Franco

Births

20 May - Francisco Cabello.
9 August - Paloma Tortajada, broadcaster and journalist (d. 2019)
17 August - Alejandro Maclean. (d. 2010)
25 September - León Villar.

Deaths
31 May - Julio García Fernández de los Ríos. (b. 1894)

Establishment

Caravaca CF.

See also
 1969 in Spanish television
 List of Spanish films of 1969

References

 
Years of the 20th century in Spain
1960s in Spain
Spain
Spain